The 2015–16 Eastern Michigan Eagles men's basketball team represented Eastern Michigan University during the 2015–16 NCAA Division I men's basketball season. The Eagles, led by fifth year head coach Rob Murphy, played their home games at the Convocation Center, as members of the West Division of the Mid-American Conference. They finished the season 18–15, 9–9 in MAC play to finish in a tie for third place in the West Division. They defeated Toledo in the first round of the MAC tournament to advance to the quarterfinals where they lost to Akron.

Previous season
The Eagles finished the season 21–14, 8–10 in MAC play to finish in a tie for fourth place in the West Division. They advanced to the quarterfinals of the MAC tournament where they lost to Toledo. They were invited to the College Basketball Invitational where they lost in the first round to Louisiana–Monroe.

Roster Changes

Departures

Incoming Transfers

Recruiting class of 2015

Preseason Accolades 
Hustle Belt Top 25 Players
 #2 Raven Lee
West Division Preseason All-MAC
 Raven Lee
Lou Henson Preseason Player of the Year Award Watch List
 Raven Lee

Roster

Schedule
Source: 

|-
!colspan=9 style="background:#006633; color:#FFFFFF;"| Non-conference regular season

|-
!colspan=9 style="background:#006633; color:#FFFFFF;"| MAC regular season

|-
!colspan=9 style="background:#006633; color:#FFFFFF;"| MAC tournament

References

Eastern Michigan Eagles men's basketball seasons
Eastern Michigan
Eastern Michigan Eagles men's basketball
Eastern Michigan Eagles men's basketball